Bamakan (also Romanized as Bāmakān, Bāmekān, and Bāmkān) is a village in Kezab Rural District, Khezrabad District, Saduq County, Yazd Province, Iran. At the 2006 census, its population was 130, in 44 families.

References 

Populated places in Saduq County